Season for Love is a 2018 American-Canadian romantic comedy. It was directed by Jill Carter and starred Autumn Reeser and Marc Blucas. It premiered on Hallmark Channel on August 25, 2018.

Plot 
Two chefs and former high school sweethearts return to their small Texas sundown town. Tylar is a single mother who just lost her job in San Francisco. Khorey is the author of bestselling cookbooks. While they compete in the Annual BBQ cook-off, their feelings are rekindled.

Cast
Autumn Reeser as Tyler Dawson
Marc Blucas as Corey Turner  
Shelley Thompson as Jo Dawson  
Lola Flanery as Rosie Dawson  
Paulino Nunes as Jay Noles  
Tara Nicodemo as Sofia Johnson  
Ray Galletti as Eddie Crowley  
Martin Roach as George

Production
The film was shot during three weeks in Port Perry, Ontario, in June 2018.

Reception
Season for Love dominated the top of the weekly cable ratings (in the Scripted Original Programs section) from August 21–26, 2018.

References

External links

Hallmark Channel original films
2018 television films
Films set in Texas
Films shot in Ontario
2018 romantic comedy films
American romantic comedy films
American comedy television films
Canadian romantic comedy films
Canadian comedy television films
English-language Canadian films
2018 films
2010s Canadian films
2010s American films
2010s English-language films